Dhammaloka may refer to:
 Uduwe Dhammaloka, a popular Buddhist monk in Sri Lanka
 U Dhammaloka (1856? – 1914?), an early western Buddhist monk in Burma and Singapore
 Dhammalok Mahasthavir (1890–1966), one of early Nepalese Buddhist monks